Paul McKinney (April 16, 1923 – June 28, 1995) was an American politician who served as a Democratic member of the Pennsylvania State Senate for the 8th district from 1975 to 1982.

Early life and education
McKinney was born in 1923 in Albany, Georgia. In 1941 he moved to Darby, Pennsylvania and served in the U.S. Merchant Marines during and after World War II.  He moved to Philadelphia, Pennsylvania in the late 1940s and attended Palmer Business College.

Business career
McKinney owned several business, his first being a restaurant and catering business with his wife Bessie. In the 1960s he owned and operated a television sales and repair shop. In 1966 he became one of Philadelphia's first African American U.S. Postal Service independent contractors.

Political career
McKinney served as a Democratic Party Committeeman and Ward Chairman of West Philadelphia's 60th Ward for a number of years. In 1974 he was elected to the Pennsylvania Senate for the 8th district and served from 1975 to 1982.

Personal life
In 1949, he married Bessie Grayson and together had five daughters. One of his daughters, Diane McKinney-Whetstone became an award-winning author and faculty member of the University of Pennsylvania's creative writing program.

References

1923 births
1995 deaths
20th-century American politicians
African-American state legislators in Pennsylvania
Democratic Party Pennsylvania state senators
People from Albany, Georgia
United States Merchant Mariners of World War II
20th-century African-American politicians